The Six-Day War was an armed conflict between Israel and a coalition of Arab states in 1967.

"Six Day War" may also refer to:

 Six Days' Campaign (1814) between Napoleon and forces from the Sixth Coalition
 Six-Day War (1899) between the British Empire and punti clans in British Hong Kong
 War in Abkhazia (1998) between Abkhaz secessionist forces and Georgian guerillas 
 Six-Day War (2000) between Rwanda and Uganda, during the Second Congo War

See also 
 Six days (disambiguation)
 The Sixth Day (disambiguation)